Rauch (meaning "smoke" or "fume" in German, perhaps an occupational name for a blacksmith or charcoal burner) may refer to:

People with the surname
 Adolf von Rauch (born 1798) (1798–1882), German paper manufacturer
 Adolf von Rauch (born 1805) (1805–1877), German cavalry officer, chamberlain and court-marshal to Princess Louise of Prussia, and chairman of the Numismatic Society in Berlin
 Albert von Rauch (1829–1901), German general of the infantry
Alfred de Rauch (1887–1985), French ice hockey player
 Alfred Bonaventura von Rauch (1824–1900), German general of the cavalry, adjutant general to the German Emperors and founder of Berlin‘s Army Steeplechase 
 Bill Rauch (born 1962), American theater director
 Bob Rauch
 Bonaventura von Rauch (1740–1814), Prussian Army major general
 Christian Daniel Rauch (1777–1857), German sculptor
 Daniel Rauch
 Dick Rauch
 Doug Rauch
 Earl Mac Rauch
 Egmont von Rauch (1829–1875), German cavalry officer and later colonel in the Prussian Army
 Erik Rauch
 Erwin Rauch
 Fedor von Rauch (1822–1892), German cavalry officer in the Prussian Army, chief equerry to the German Emperors, and vice-president of the Union Club in Berlin
 Felicitas Rauch (born 1996), German footballer
 František Rauch
 Franz Rauch
 Fred Rauch
 Frederick Augustus Rauch
 Friedrich von Rauch (born 1855) (1855–1935), Prussian general of the cavalry 
 Friedrich Wilhelm von Rauch (born 1790) (1790–1850), German lieutenant general, adjutant general to King Frederick William IV of Prussia and military attaché at the court of Emperor Nicholas I of Russia
 Friedrich Wilhelm von Rauch (born 1827) (1827–1907), German lieutenant general in the Prussian Army
 Friedrich Wilhelm von Rauch (born 1868)(1868-1899),  German first lieutenant in the Prussian Army and Military Governor of Emperor William II's sons
 Federico Rauch
 Georg von Rauch (historian) (1904–1991), Baltic-German historian
 George W. Rauch (1876–1940), American politician
 Gustav von Rauch (1774–1841), Prussian general of the infantry and Minister of War from 1837 to 1841, honorary citizen of Berlin
 Gustav Waldemar von Rauch (1819–1890), German general of the cavalry in the Prussian Army
 Hans Rauch
 Harry Rauch (1925–1979), American mathematician
 Heinz Rauch
 Helmut Rauch
 Irmengard Rauch
 Isabelle Rauch (born 1968), French politician
 Jamie Rauch
 Janette Rauch
 Jasen Rauch American musician
 Jeffrey Rauch
 Johann Georg Rauch (composer) (1658–1710), German composer and organist at Strasbourg Cathedral
 Johann Georg Rauch (politician) ((1789 – 1851), Swiss politician and playing card manufacturer
 Johannes Rauch
 John Rauch (architect) (born 1930), American architect, member of Venturi, Rauch & Scott Brown
 John Rauch, former head coach of the Oakland Raiders and Buffalo Bills
 John Henry Rauch
 John T. Rauch
 Jonathan Rauch (born 1960), American journalist
 Jon Rauch (born 1978), baseball pitcher for the New York Mets
 Laurika Rauch, South African singer  
 Leopold von Rauch (1787–1860), German general in the Prussian Army
 Levin Rauch (1819–1890), Hungarian politician and viceroy of Croatia-Slavonia
 Marshall Rauch, American businessman and North Carolina politician
 Martin Rauch
 Madeleine de Rauch, French Haute Couture fashion designer; see Marc Bohan
 Meir Rauch
 Melissa Rauch, American actress
 Neo Rauch (born 1960), German painter
 Nikolaus von Rauch (1851–1904), German colonel and cavalry officer in the Prussian Army
 Otton Egorovich Rauch
 Paul Rauch
 Robert L. "Nob" Rauch (born 1958), flying disc sports administrator
 Rosalie von Rauch (1820–1879), second, morganatic wife to Prince Albert of Prussia (as Countess of Hohenau)
 Rudolf Rauch
 Sandra Rauch (born 1967), German artist
 Scott L. Rauch
 Sebastian Rauch
 Sibylle Rauch (born 1960), German actress and model
 Siegfried Rauch
 Stephan Rauch
 Walter Rauch
 Wendelin Rauch

Places
 Rauch, Buenos Aires, the cabecera (district capital) of Rauch partido
 Rauch Partido, a partido (department) in Buenos Aires Province, Argentina
 Rauch, Minnesota, an unincorporated community in northern Minnesota, United States

Other
 Rauch (company), an Austrian company that produces iced tea, juices and sports drinks
 Rauch (crater), a crater on Mars named after the Argentine partido
 "Rauch", a song from the album In Silence We Yearn by Oh Hiroshima

German-language surnames
Surnames of German origin
Occupational surnames